Vittorio Veneto may refer to:

 Vittorio Veneto, Italian city and comune

Military
 Italian battleship Vittorio Veneto
 Italian cruiser Vittorio Veneto (550)
 Battle of Vittorio Veneto, 1918

See also
 
 
 Veneto (disambiguation)